The People's Institute for Survival and Beyond (PISAB) is a non-profit organization that provides education and training to individuals and organizations on issues related to systemic racism and social justice. The organization was founded in 1980 by civil rights activists Ronald Chisom and American scholar and activist, Dr. Jimm Dunn. The organization is based in New Orleans, Louisiana and has trained numerous individuals across the United States and internationally.

Programs/Initiatives

Undoing Racism 
The People's Institute for Survival and Beyond offers an Undoing Racism program that tries to address the systemic and institutionalized nature of racism in our society. The program uses a multi-dimensional approach that incorporates historical analysis, group participation, and community organizing strategies. Participants in the program engage in a series of workshops and discussions that are designed to challenge their assumptions about race, privilege, and power. The program is designed to be accessible to a broad range of individuals and organizations, including community groups, non-profits, government agencies, and businesses. It has been implemented in a variety of settings, including schools, hospitals, and social service agencies.

In 2019, the Undoing Racism workgroup was established as part of the organizations Undoing racism program.

People's Institute Youth Agenda (PIYA) 
PIYA is a program by People's Institute for Survival and Beyond through which young left-wing activists and community organizers are recruited to help the organization in their trainings and workshops. The program was started in 1996 by the young activists and is tailored for youths aged 12-18 years.

European Dissent 
This is a program that specifically designed for individuals of European descent who are interested in working towards racial justice and equity. The program seeks to address the ways in which white privilege and racism operate in our society and to empower participants to take action to dismantle these structures.

References

External links 
Organization website

Non-governmental organizations
Social justice organizations
Social justice activists
Nonpartisan organizations in the United States
Civil rights movement
1980